The Socialist Equality Party (SEP) is an unregistered Trotskyist political party in Australia. The SEP was established in 2010 as the successor party to the Socialist Labour League, which was founded in 1972 as the Australian section of the International Committee of the Fourth International (ICFI).

According to its 2019 election statement, the party opposes identity politics and the Me Too movement, stating that identity politics “is aimed at splitting the working class and obscuring the fact that in capitalist society the fundamental divide is that of class—between the working class and its exploiters, i.e., those who own the means of production and finance.” Similarly they stated that the Me Too movement is: “used by the upper-middle class to enhance their privileged economic and social position.” The party also criticises contemporary trade unions, having adopted the position that "They are no longer workers’ organisations."

History

Foundation
Inspired by the British Socialist Labour League, Nick Beams and other young Australian radicals founded the Socialist Labour League (SLL) in 1972. Throughout the 1970s and 1980s, the SLL supported strikes against the Fraser (Liberal) and Hawke (ALP) governments. By the 1980s the party's newspaper, Workers News, was circulated in all major cities twice a week.

In its 1993 perspectives resolution, the SLL drew a balance sheet of the response of the petty-bourgeois "left" tendencies to the demise of the Soviet Union and the dissolution of the Communist Party of Australia in 1991, arguing that "As long as the working class was dominated by and subordinated to the vast apparatuses of Stalinism and Laborism, they were happy to define themselves as ‘socialists’ and even as ‘Marxists’ or ‘revolutionaries’. They formed part and parcel of the petty-bourgeois buffer, created by the ruling class in the aftermath of the war, to suffocate the working class."

Refoundation
The Socialist Labour League was officially refounded as the Socialist Equality Party in 2010, with its founding congress held in Sydney on 21–25 January 2010, where it unanimously adopted a statement of principles.

Electoral results
In elections, the party's strongest state has historically been New South Wales. Demographically, the party is stronger with younger voters.

In the 2016 federal election the Socialist Equality Party fielded two senate candidates in each of New South Wales, Queensland and Victoria, two candidates in New South Wales for the House of Representatives and one in Victoria for the seat of Wills, which also had a Socialist Alliance candidate.

See also
 Socialism in Australia
 Socialist Alliance (Australia)

Notes

References

External links
Socialist Equality Party (Australia) Official site.
World Socialist Web Site Official site.

1933 establishments in Australia
2010 establishments in Australia
Communist parties in Australia
International Committee of the Fourth International
Political parties established in 1933
Political parties established in 2010
Trotskyist organisations in Australia